Ty England is the self-titled debut album from the American country music artist of the same name. Formerly a guitarist in Garth Brooks' road band, England recorded and released his solo debut album in 1995 on the Nashville division of RCA Records. The album's first single, "Should've Asked Her Faster", peaked at number 3 on the Billboard Hot Country Singles & Tracks (now Hot Country Songs) charts; the second and third singles ("Smoke in Her Eyes" and "Redneck Son", respectively) both failed to make Top 40 on the same chart. "Her Only Bad Habit Is Me" was originally recorded by George Strait on his 1991 album Chill of an Early Fall.

Track listing

Personnel
Compiled from liner notes.

Musicians

 Bobby All — acoustic guitar (2,3,5,6,7,9,10)
 Eddie Bayers — drums (tracks 1,2,9)
 Richard Bennett — acoustic guitar (tracks 4,8)
 J. T. Corenflos — electric guitar (track 10)
 Stuart Duncan — fiddle (track 3)
 Ty England — lead vocals, background vocals (tracks 7,8)
 Paul Franklin — steel guitar (all tracks except 4)
 Garth Fundis — background vocals (track 7)
 John Gardner — drums (tracks 4,8)
 Aubrey Haynie — fiddle (track 2,5,6,7,9,10)
 John Hobbs — piano (tracks 5,6,7,10), organ (track 10)
 Paul Leim — drums (tracks 3,5,6,7,10)
 Mark Luna — background vocals (tracks 2,10)
 Brent Mason — electric guitar (all tracks except 10)
 Weldon Myrick — steel guitar (track 4)
 Steve Nathan — Wurlitzer electric piano (track 1), piano (tracks 2,4,8,9), keyboards 
 Dave Pomeroy — bass guitar
 Hargus "Pig" Robbins — piano (track 3)
 John Wesley Ryles — background vocals (track 3)
 Billy Joe Walker, Jr. — acoustic guitar (track 1)
 Dennis Wilson — background vocals (tracks 2,4,5,9)
 Curtis "Mr. Harmony" Young — background vocals (track 1,6)

Technical
 Garth Fundis — production, mixing
 Scott Pascchall — production assistant
 Denny Purcell — mastering
 Dave Sinko — recording, mixing

Chart performance

References

1995 debut albums
Ty England albums
RCA Records albums
Albums produced by Garth Fundis